"Vete" (English: "Leave") is a song by Puerto Rican rapper Bad Bunny. It was released as the lead single off his second solo studio album YHLQMDLG by Rimas Entertainment on November 21, 2019.

Critical reception
Ecleen Luzmila Caraballo of Remezcla pointed out that the song does not stand out amongst his previous releases but "it lives on an emo wavelength I (and I suspect many of you) generally appreciate, and have come to expect from this urbano loverboy". Alejandra Cortés at Nación Rex praised the song for having a sticky rhythm that makes one want to dance.

Music video
The video was released on November 21, 2019, and was directed by Cliqua x Stillz. It features the singer stepping into a light that previously illuminated him and performing next to a LaFerrari in front of a fire afterwards. He is later seen showing off the car at a party. The Fader's Jordan Darville described the visuals as "sad yet flashy, juxtaposing images of a spurned young child with Bad Bunny flexing from another dimension as only he can".

Charts

Weekly charts

Year-end charts

Certifications

See also
List of Billboard number-one Latin songs of 2019
List of Billboard number-one Latin songs of 2020

References

2019 singles
2019 songs
Bad Bunny songs
Spanish-language songs
Songs written by Bad Bunny
Songs written by Edgar Semper
Songs written by Xavier Semper